The Cultrinae are one of at least 13 subfamilies of cyprinid fish. It contains ten genera.

Recognized genera
 Anabarilius (21 species)
 Ancherythroculter (5 species)
 Chanodichthys (5 species)
 Culter (4 species)
 Cultrichthys (monotypic)
 Erythroculter (monotypic)
 Hainania (monotypic)
 Hemiculter (8 species)
 Ischikauia (monotypic)
 Megalobrama (5 species)
 Parabramis – white Amur bream (monotypic)
 Paralaubuca (5 species)
 Pseudohemiculter (4 species)
 Pseudolaubuca (4 species)
 Sinibrama (6 species)
 Toxabramis (7 species)

References 

Preliminary studies on phylogeny of subfamily Cultrinae (Cypriniformes: Cyprinidae), P. Yue, Y, Luo, Acta Hydrobiologica Sinica, 1996
Phylogeny and zoogeography of the cyprinid hemicultrine group (Cyprinidae: Cultrinae),YG Dai, JX Yang, Zoological Studies-Taipei-, 2003  
Phylogeny and zoogeography of the subfamily Cultrinae (Cyprinidae), Dai Yinggui, Yang Junxing, Chen Yinrui, Acta Zootaxonomica Sinica 01 Jan 2005, 30(2):213-233

 
Fish subfamilies